The 1970 Saint Louis Billikens men's soccer team represented Saint Louis University during the 1970 NCAA soccer season. The Billikens won their eighth NCAA title this season. It was the 12th ever season the Billikens fielded a men's varsity soccer team.

Dan Counce lead the Billikens in scoring this season, amassing 14 goals over the course of the season. Captain, Al Trost won the Hermann Trophy.

Roster 
The following individuals played for the Billikens during the 1970 season.

Schedule 

|-
!colspan=6 style=""| Regular season
|-

|-
!colspan=6 style=""| NCAA Tournament
|-

Honors and awards 
The following players earned a postseason award.

National awards 

 Hermann Trophy
 Al Trost
 NSCAA All-Americans
 Al Trost (First-Team All-American)
 Joe Hamm (Honorable Mention All-American)

References 

1970
1970 NCAA soccer independents season
American soccer clubs 1970 season
1970 in sports in Missouri
1970 NCAA Soccer Championship participants
1970
1970 Saint Louis